John Traynor may refer to:

John Traynor (footballer) (born 1966), Scottish professional footballer
Jay Traynor (1943–2014), American singer
John Traynor (criminal) (1948–2021), Irish criminal
John T. Traynor (1926–2021), American politician
 John Traynor (Lourdes pilgrim) (1883–1943)

See also
Jack Traynor (disambiguation)